Nathaniel Michael Garbark (February 3, 1916 – August 31, 1994) was a Major League Baseball player. He batted and threw right-handed.

He was born in Houston, Texas and died in Charlotte, North Carolina.

Garbark's brother, Bob Garbark, also played in the Majors.

External links
, or SABR Biography Project

1916 births
1994 deaths
Akron Yankees players
Albany Senators players
Augusta Tigers players
Baseball players from Texas
Binghamton Triplets players
Charleston Rebels players
Chattanooga Lookouts players
Gastonia Rockets players
Greenwood Tigers players
Kansas City Blues (baseball) players
Major League Baseball catchers
New York Yankees players
Newark Bears (IL) players
Rock Hill Chiefs players
San Antonio Missions players
Youngstown A's players